Tomsk Railway was a rail operator in Siberia.

Main information
The railway existed as a company from 1912 to 1961 in Russian Empire, then in USSR. The management of the line was in Tomsk, since 1934 in Novosibirsk.

History
Tomsk railway was formed from the Siberian railway, which in 1912 was divided into two parts: in the Omsk and Tomsk Railways. After the October revolution Tomsk Railway came into Achinsk Minusinsk, first is expected to launch and Altai Railway.
The accession of the neighbouring roads allowed Tomsk railway eventually become the biggest longest and most powerful for the loads among the Railways of the USSR.

In 1961 the Tomsk railway was united with Omsk railway and became the major West Siberian Railway.

References

External links

 Map of Tomsk Railway 
 Дмитрий Афонин. Путевые заметки. Сквозь ветви сосен (Тайга–Богашёво)
 Дмитрий Афонин. Путевые заметки. Вокруг да около (Богашёво–Томск-II)
 Дмитрий Афонин. Томск и Транссиб
 Дмитрий Афонин. В поисках черемошинской линии 

Former railway lines in Russia
Railway companies established in 1912
Railway companies disestablished in 1961